Thiersch is a German surname.  People named Thiersch include:
 August Thiersch (1843-1917), architect
 Bernhard Thiersch (1794–1855), schoolteacher and composer of the Prussian national anthem
 Friedrich Thiersch (1784–1860), classicist and philhellene
 Friedrich von Thiersch (1852–1921), architect and painter
 Hans Thiersch (born 1935), professor of pedagogy
 Hermann Thiersch (1874-1939), archaeologist
 H. W. J. Thiersch (1817–1885), theologian in the Catholic Apostolic Church, and son of Friedrich
 Karl Thiersch (1822–1895), surgeon, and son of Friedrich
 Ludwig Thiersch (1825–1909), painter, philhellene, and son of Friedrich
 Paul Thiersch (1879-1928), architect
 Urban Thiersch (1916–1984), sculptor involved in the July 20 Plot to assassinate Hitler